Irving Romaro Calkins (October 31, 1875 – August 26, 1958) was an American sport shooter who competed at the 1908 Summer Olympics.

At the 1908 Olympics he won a gold medal in the team pistol event and finished in eighth place in the individual pistol event.  He became world champion in 1923.

References

External links
Irving Calkins' profile at databaseOlympics

1875 births
1958 deaths
American male sport shooters
ISSF pistol shooters
Shooters at the 1908 Summer Olympics
Olympic gold medalists for the United States in shooting
People from Palmer, Massachusetts
Sportspeople from Hampden County, Massachusetts
Olympic medalists in shooting
Medalists at the 1908 Summer Olympics
19th-century American people
20th-century American people